The 1990 Thuringia state election was held on 14 October 1990 to elect the members of the first Landtag of Thuringia. It was the first election held in Thuringia since the reunification of Germany, which took place on 3 October. The Christian Democratic Union (CDU) led by Josef Duchač emerged as the largest party with 45.4%, followed by the Social Democratic Party (SPD) with 22.8%. The CDU formed a coalition with the Free Democratic Party (FDP), and Duchač became Thuringia's first post-reunification Minister-President.

Parties
The table below lists parties which won seats in the election.

Election result

|-
! colspan="2" | Party
! Votes
! %
! Seats 
! Seats %
|-
| bgcolor=| 
| align=left | Christian Democratic Union (CDU)
| align=right| 637,055
| align=right| 45.4
| align=right| 44
| align=right| 49.4
|-
| bgcolor=| 
| align=left | Social Democratic Party (SPD)
| align=right| 319,376
| align=right| 22.8
| align=right| 21
| align=right| 23.6
|-
| bgcolor=| 
| align=left | Party of Democratic Socialism (PDS)
| align=right| 136,464
| align=right| 9.7
| align=right| 9
| align=right| 10.1
|-
| bgcolor=| 
| align=left | Free Democratic Party (FDP)
| align=right| 130,035
| align=right| 9.3
| align=right| 9
| align=right| 10.1
|-
| bgcolor=| 
| align=left | New Forum/The Greens/Democracy Now (Grüne)
| align=right| 90,829
| align=right| 6.5
| align=right| 6
| align=right| 6.7
|-
! colspan=8|
|-
| bgcolor=| 
| align=left | German Social Union (DSU)
| align=right| 45,979
| align=right| 3.3
| align=right| 0
| align=right| 0
|-
| bgcolor=|
| align=left | Others
| align=right| 43,616
| align=right| 3.1
| align=right| 0
| align=right| 0
|-
! align=right colspan=2| Total
! align=right| 1,403,354
! align=right| 100.0
! align=right| 89
! align=right| 
|-
! align=right colspan=2| Voter turnout
! align=right| 
! align=right| 71.7
! align=right| 
! align=right| 
|}

Sources
 Ergebnisse der Landtagswahlen in Thüringen seit 1945

1990
1990 elections in Germany